My Man Godfrey is a 1957 American CinemaScope comedy film starring June Allyson and David Niven.  It was adapted by Peter Berneis, William Bowers and Everett Freeman, and directed by Henry Koster. The film is a color remake of Gregory La Cava's 1936 screwball comedy of the same name. Allyson played the role created by Carole Lombard in the original version, and Niven took on the role made famous by William Powell. Niven had played the role of Tommy Gray, Godfrey's former classmate, in a 1938 radio version.

Plot
The plot begins as a zany heiress uses and then takes pity on a man whom she believes to be homeless. She insists the man come home with her and gives him a job as the eccentric family's butler—much to the chagrin of her father, especially when it becomes clear the girl is falling in love with the fellow. The family's new butler, however, harbors a secret: he is actually as wealthy as and, in fact, more well-born than they are.

Cast
 June Allyson as Irene [Bullock]	 
 David Niven as Godfrey	 
 Jessie Royce Landis as Angelica [Bullock]	 
 Robert Keith as Mr. [Alexander] Bullock	 
 Eva Gabor as Francesca [Gray]	 
 Jay Robinson as Vincent	 
 Martha Hyer as Cordelia [Bullock]	 
 Jeff Donnell as Molly	 
 Herbert Anderson as Hubert	 
 Eric Sinclair as Brent	 
 Dabbs Greer as Lieutenant O'Connor	 
 Fred Essler as Captain

Production
The film was meant to mark the Hollywood debut of O. W. Fischer, but he was fired two weeks into production and was sued by Universal.

References

External links 
 
 
 
 
 

1957 films
1957 comedy films
American comedy films
Remakes of American films
1950s English-language films
Films about dysfunctional families
Films about social class
Films directed by Henry Koster
Films produced by Ross Hunter
Films scored by Frank Skinner
Films set in Manhattan
Universal Pictures films
CinemaScope films
1950s American films